The 2010–11 Philadelphia Flyers season was the Flyers' 44th season in the National Hockey League (NHL). The Flyers lost in the second round of the 2011 playoffs to the Boston Bruins in a four-game sweep.

Off-season
Coming off a close loss to the Chicago Blackhawks in the Stanley Cup Finals, the Flyers traded Simon Gagne to the Tampa Bay Lightning to clear up cap space, acquired Andrej Meszároš from Tampa Bay in a separate trade and signed free agent Sean O'Donnell to shore up the defense.

Regular season
The Flyers started the season with rookie goaltender Sergei Bobrovsky from the Kontinental Hockey League (KHL) in Russia, who recorded an opening-night win in his NHL debut against the Pittsburgh Penguins and had steady numbers throughout the season. Brian Boucher remained as the backup goaltender while Michael Leighton played one game in December after recovering from a back injury and was sent to Adirondack in the AHL. The Flyers led both the Atlantic Division and Eastern Conference for the majority of the season and challenged the Vancouver Canucks for the overall NHL lead. Kris Versteeg was brought in from the Toronto Maple Leafs to add additional offense for the stretch drive and playoffs. However, lackluster play throughout March and April, coupled with a broken hand suffered by Chris Pronger in late February that ended his regular season, cost the Flyers the top seed in the East during the last week of the regular season, although the Flyers hung on to win their first Atlantic Division title since 2003–04 and clinched the second seed in the East.

Season standings

Playoffs

The Flyers drew the Buffalo Sabres in the first round. Sergei Bobrovsky played well in a 1–0 Game 1 loss, but was replaced in Game 2 for Brian Boucher, who held on for a 5–4 Flyers win. Boucher played well in a Game 3 win and a Game 4 loss, but was replaced himself in a favor of Michael Leighton during a poor first period in Game 5, and Buffalo won in overtime. Pronger returned to the lineup and Leighton started Game 6 but was replaced by Boucher after a sub-par first period, but the Flyers went on to win in overtime and forced a Game 7, which Boucher started. The Flyers dominated Buffalo, winning 5–2, and became the first team to win a playoff series starting three different goaltenders since 1988.

The Flyers then drew a rematch with the Boston Bruins in the second round. Boston dominated the Flyers in Game 1, where Boucher was again replaced, this time by Bobrovsky. Pronger again left the lineup with an undisclosed injury, while Boston won Game 2 in overtime and again dominated the Flyers in Game 3 to take a 3–0 series lead. Bobrovsky started Game 4, but there would be no such comeback like their previous meeting as Boston completed the sweep of the Flyers. The Flyers tied an NHL record with seven playoff in-game goalie changes, and were the only NHL team not to record a shutout in either the regular season or playoffs.

Schedule and results

Preseason

|- style="background:#cfc;"
| 1 || September 21 || New Jersey Devils || 4–3 (SO) || 19,288 || 1–0–0 || 
|- style="background:#ffc;"
| 2 || September 23 || Toronto Maple Leafs || 2–3 (SO) || 8,765 || 1–0–1 || 
|- style="background:#cfc;"
| 3 || September 24 || @ Toronto Maple Leafs || 4–3 (SO) || 18,375 || 2–0–1 || 
|- style="background:#cfc;"
| 4 || September 25 || @ Minnesota Wild || 3–2 (SO) || 16,742 || 3–0–1 || 
|- style="background:#fcf;"
| 5 || September 28 || @ New Jersey Devils || 2–3 || 10,124 || 3–1–1 || 
|- style="background:#cfc;"
| 6 || September 29 || New York Islanders || 3–1 || 17,978 || 4–1–1 || 
|-  style="background:#cfc;"
| 7 || October 1 || Buffalo Sabres || 1–3 || 18,848 || 4–2–1 || 
|-  style="background:#fcf;"
| 8 || October 3 || @ Buffalo Sabres || 3–9 || 18,690 || 4–3–1 || 
|-
| colspan="7" style="text-align:center;"|
Notes:
 Game played at John Labatt Centre in London, Ontario.
|-

|-
| Legend:

Regular season

|-  style="background:#cfc;"
| 1 || October 7 || @ Pittsburgh Penguins || 3–2 || 18,289 || 1–0–0  || 2 || 
|-  style="background:#ffc;"
| 2 || October 9 || @ St. Louis Blues || 1–2 (OT)|| 19,150 || 1–0–1 || 3 || 
|-  style="background:#cfc;"
| 3 || October 11 || Colorado Avalanche || 4–2 || 19,652 || 2–0–1 || 5 || 
|-  style="background:#fcf;"
| 4 || October 14 || Tampa Bay Lightning || 2–3 || 19,592 || 2–1–1 || 5 || 
|-  style="background:#fcf;"
| 5 || October 16 || Pittsburgh Penguins || 1–5 || 19,684 || 2–2–1 || 5 || 
|-  style="background:#fcf;"
| 6 || October 21 || Anaheim Ducks || 2–3 || 19,012 || 2–3–1 || 5 || 
|-  style="background:#cfc;"
| 7 || October 23 || Toronto Maple Leafs || 5–2 || 19,382 || 3–3–1 || 7 || 
|-  style="background:#fcf;"
| 8 || October 25 || @ Columbus Blue Jackets || 1–2 || 11,727 || 3–4–1 || 7 || 
|-  style="background:#cfc;"
| 9 || October 26 || Buffalo Sabres || 6–3 || 19,361 || 4–4–1  || 9 || 
|-  style="background:#cfc;"
| 10 || October 29 || @ Pittsburgh Penguins || 3–2 || 18,275 || 5–4–1 || 11 || 
|-  style="background:#cfc;"
| 11 || October 30 || New York Islanders || 6–1|| 19,613 || 6–4–1 || 13 || 
|-

|-  style="background:#cfc;"
| 12 || November 1 || Carolina Hurricanes || 3–2|| 19,038 || 7–4–1 || 15 || 
|-  style="background:#cfc;"
| 13 || November 4 || New York Rangers || 4–1 || 19,652 || 8–4–1 || 17 || 
|-  style="background:#cfc;"
| 14 || November 6 || @ New York Islanders || 2–1|| 13,078 || 9–4–1 || 19 || 
|-  style="background:#ffc;"
| 15 || November 7 || @ Washington Capitals || 2–3 (OT) || 18,398 || 9–4–2 || 20 || 
|-  style="background:#cfc;"
| 16 || November 11 || @ Carolina Hurricanes || 8–1|| 14,719 || 10–4–2 ||22 || 
|-  style="background:#cfc;"
| 17 || November 13 || Florida Panthers || 5–2 || 19,616 || 11–4–2 || 24 || 
|-  style="background:#cfc;"
| 18 || November 15 || Ottawa Senators || 5–1 || 19,246 || 12–4–2 || 26 || 
|-  style="background:#fcf;"
| 19 || November 16 || @ Montreal Canadiens || 0–3 || 21,273 || 12–5–2 || 26 || 
|-  style="background:#fcf;"
| 20 || November 18 || Tampa Bay Lightning || 7–8|| 19,672 || 12–6–2  || 26 || 
|-  style="background:#cfc;"
| 21 || November 20 || @ Washington Capitals || 5–4 (SO) || 18,398 || 13–6–2 || 28 || 
|-  style="background:#cfc;"
| 22 || November 22 || Montreal Canadiens || 3–2|| 19,753 || 14–6–2 || 30 || 
|-  style="background:#cfc;"
| 23 || November 24 || @ Minnesota Wild || 6–1|| 16,516 || 15–6–2 || 32 || 
|-  style="background:#ffc;"
| 24 || November 26 || Calgary Flames || 2–3 (SO) || 19,872 || 15–6–3 || 33 || 
|-  style="background:#ffc;"
| 25 || November 27 || @ New Jersey Devils || 1–2 (SO) || 17,625 || 15–6–4 || 34 || 
|-

|-  style="background:#fcf;"
| 26 || December 1 || Boston Bruins || 0–3 || 19,684 || 15–7–4 || 34 || 
|-  style="background:#cfc;"
| 27 || December 4 || New Jersey Devils || 5–3|| 19,657 || 16–7–4 || 36 || 
|-  style="background:#cfc;"
| 28 || December 5 || @ New York Islanders || 3–2 || 7,773 || 17–7–4  || 38 || 
|-  style="background:#ffc;"
| 29 || December 8 || San Jose Sharks || 4–5 (SO)  || 19,801 || 17–7–5 || 39 || 
|-  style="background:#cfc;"
| 30 || December 9 || @ Toronto Maple Leafs || 4–1 || 19,365 || 18–7–5  || 41 || 
|-  style="background:#cfc;"
| 31 || December 11 || @ Boston Bruins || 2–1 (OT) || 17,565 || 19–7–5 || 43 || 
|-  style="background:#cfc;"
| 32 || December 14 || Pittsburgh Penguins || 3–2 || 19,824 || 20–7–5 || 45 || 
|-  style="background:#cfc;"
| 33 || December 15 || @ Montreal Canadiens || 5–3|| 21,273 || 21–7–5 || 47 || 
|-  style="background:#cfc;"
| 34 || December 18 || New York Rangers || 4–1 || 19,898 || 22–7–5 || 49 || 
|-  style="background:#fcf;"
| 35 || December 20 || Florida Panthers || 0–5 || 19,864 || 22–8–5 || 49 || 
|-  style="background:#fcf;"
| 36 || December 28 || @ Vancouver Canucks || 2–6 || 18,860 || 22–9–5 || 49 || 
|-  style="background:#cfc;"
| 37 || December 30 || @ Los Angeles Kings || 7–4|| 18,118 || 23–9–5 ||51 || 
|-  style="background:#fcf;"
| 38 || December 31 || @ Anaheim Ducks || 2–5 || 17,103 || 23–10–5 || 51 || 
|-

|-  style="background:#cfc;"
| 39 || January 2 || @ Detroit Red Wings || 3–2 || 20,066 || 24–10–5 || 53 || 
|-  style="background:#cfc;"
| 40 || January 6 || @ New Jersey Devils || 4–2|| 15,098 || 25–10–5 || 55 || 
|- style="background:#cfc;"
| 41 || January 8 || New Jersey Devils || 2–1 || 19,859 || 26–10–5 || 57 || 
|-  style="background:#cfc;"
| 42 || January 11 || @ Buffalo Sabres || 5–2 || 18,155 || 27–10–5 || 59 || 
|-  style="background:#fcf;"
| 43 || January 13 || @ Boston Bruins || 5–7 || 17,565 ||27–11–5 || 59 || 
|-  style="background:#cfc;"
| 44 || January 14 || @ Atlanta Thrashers || 5–2|| 15,081 || 28–11–5 || 61 || 
|-  style="background:#cfc;"
| 45 || January 16 || @ New York Rangers || 3–2 || 18,200 || 29–11–5 || 63 || 
|-  style="background:#cfc;"
| 46 || January 18 || Washington Capitals || 3–2 (OT) || 19,824 || 30–11–5 || 65 || 
|-  style="background:#cfc;"
| 47 || January 20 || Ottawa Senators || 6–2 || 19,721 || 31–11–5 || 67 || 
|-  style="background:#fcf;"
| 48 || January 22 || New Jersey Devils || 1–3|| 19,847 || 31–12–5 || 67 || 
|-  style="background:#cfc;"
| 49 || January 23 || @ Chicago Blackhawks || 4–1 || 21,660 || 32–12–5 || 69 || 
|-  style="background:#cfc;"
| 50 || January 25 || Montreal Canadiens || 5–2 || 19,878 || 33–12–5 || 71 || 
|-

|-  style="background:#fcf;"
| 51 || February 1 || @ Tampa Bay Lightning || 0–4 || 16,635 || 33–13–5 || 71 || 
|-  style="background:#cfc;"
| 52 || February 3 || Nashville Predators || 3–2|| 19,702 || 34–13–5 || 73 || 
|-  style="background:#cfc;"
| 53 || February 5 || Dallas Stars || 3–1 || 19,881 || 35–13–5 || 75 || 
|-  style="background:#cfc;"
| 54 || February 10 || Carolina Hurricanes || 2–1 || 19,726 || 36–13–5 || 77 || 
|-  style="background:#fcf;"
| 55 || February 13 || Los Angeles Kings || 0–1 || 19,724 || 36–14–5 || 77 || 
|-  style="background:#cfc;"
| 56 || February 15 || @ Tampa Bay Lightning || 4–3 (SO) || 16,950 || 37–14–5 || 79 || 
|-  style="background:#cfc;"
| 57 || February 16 || @ Florida Panthers || 4–2 || 17,077 || 38–14–5 || 81 || 
|-  style="background:#fcf;"
| 58 || February 18 || @ Carolina Hurricanes || 2–3 || 18,726 || 38–15–5 || 81 || 
|-  style="background:#cfc;"
| 59 || February 20 || @ New York Rangers || 4–2 || 18,200 ||39–15–5 || 83 || 
|- style="background:#ffc;"
| 60 || February 22 || Phoenix Coyotes || 2–3 (OT) || 19,875 ||  39–15–6 || 84 || 
|-  style="background:#cfc;"
| 61 || February 24 || New York Islanders || 4–3 (OT) || 19,776 || 40–15–6 || 86 || 
|-  style="background:#fcf;"
| 62 || February 26 || @ Ottawa Senators || 1–4|| 19,934 || 40–16–6 || 86 || 
|-

|-  style="background:#fcf;"
| 63 || March 3 || Toronto Maple Leafs || 2–3 || 19,811 || 40–17–6 || 86 || 
|-  style="background:#fcf;"
| 64 || March 5 || Buffalo Sabres || 3–5|| 19,901 || 40–18–6 ||86 || 
|-  style="background:#fcf;"
| 65 || March 6 || @ New York Rangers || 0–7 || 18,200 || 40–19–6  || 86 || 
|-  style="background:#cfc;"
| 66 || March 8 || Edmonton Oilers ||  4–1 || 19,730 || 41–19–6  || 88 || 
|-  style="background:#cfc;"
| 67 || March 10 || @ Toronto Maple Leafs || 3–2 || 19,475 || 42–19–6  || 90 || 
|- style="background:#ffc;"
| 68 || March 12 || Atlanta Thrashers || 4–5 (OT) || 19,892 || 42–19–7 || 91 || 
|-  style="background:#cfc;"
| 69 || March 15 || @ Florida Panthers || 3–2 || 17,377 || 43–19–7 || 93 || 
|- style="background:#ffc;"
| 70 || March 17 || @ Atlanta Thrashers || 3–4 (SO) || 16,502 || 43–19–8 || 94 || 
|-  style="background:#cfc;"
| 71 || March 19 || @ Dallas Stars || 3–2 (SO)  || 17,652 || 44–19–8  || 96 || 
|- style="background:#ffc;"
| 72 || March 22 || Washington Capitals || 4–5 (SO) || 19,893 || 44–19–9  || 97 || 
|- style="background:#ffc;"
| 73 || March 24 || Pittsburgh Penguins || 1–2 (SO) || 19,902 || 44–19–10 || 98 || 
|-  style="background:#cfc;"
| 74 || March 26 || @ New York Islanders || 4–1 || 15,458 || 45–19–10  || 100 || 
|-  style="background:#fcf;"
| 75 || March 27 || Boston Bruins || 1–2 || 19,927 || 45–20–10 || 100 || 
|-  style="background:#cfc;"
| 76 || March 29 || @ Pittsburgh Penguins || 5–2 || 18,335 || 46–20–10  || 102 || 
|-  style="background:#fcf;"
| 77 || March 31 || Atlanta Thrashers || 0–1 || 19,879 || 46–21–10  || 102 || 
|-

|-  style="background:#fcf;"
| 78 || April 1 || @ New Jersey Devils || 2–4 || 17,625 || 46–22–10 || 102 || 
|- style="background:#ffc;"
| 79 || April 3 || New York Rangers || 2–3 (SO) || 19,788 || 46–22–11  || 103 || 
|-  style="background:#fcf;"
| 80 || April 5 || @ Ottawa Senators || 2–5 || 18,397 || 46–23–11 || 103 || 
|- style="background:#ffc;"
| 81 || April 8 || @ Buffalo Sabres || 3–4 (OT) || 18,690 || 46–23–12  || 104 || 
|-  style="background:#cfc;"
| 82 || April 9 || New York Islanders || 7–4 || 19,909 || 47–23–12 || 106 || 
|-

|-
| Legend:

Playoffs

|- style="background:#fcf;"
| 1 || April 14 || Buffalo|| 1–0  || Philadelphia || || Bobrovsky  || 19,929 || Sabres lead 1–0 || 
|- style="background:#cfc;"
| 2 || April 16 || Buffalo|| 4–5  || Philadelphia || || Boucher  || 19,942|| Series tied 1–1 || 
|- style="background:#cfc;"
| 3 || April 18 || Philadelphia || 4–2 || Buffalo || || Boucher || 18,690 || Flyers lead 2–1 || 
|- style="background:#fcf;"
| 4 || April 20 || Philadelphia || 0–1 || Buffalo || || Boucher || 18,690 || Series tied 2–2 || 
|- style="background:#fcf;"
| 5 || April 22 || Buffalo || 4–3 || Philadelphia || OT || Leighton || 19,959 || Sabres lead 3–2 || 
|- style="background:#cfc;"
| 6 || April 24 || Philadelphia || 5–4 || Buffalo || OT || Boucher || 18,690 || Series tied 3–3 || 
|- style="background:#cfc;"
| 7 || April 26 || Buffalo || 2–5 || Philadelphia || || Boucher || 19,966 || Flyers win 4–3 || 
|-

|- style="background:#fcf;"
| 1 || April 30 || Boston || 7–3 || Philadelphia || || Boucher || 19,641 || Bruins lead 1–0 || 
|- style="background:#fcf;"
| 2 || May 2 || Boston || 3–2 || Philadelphia  || OT || Boucher || 19,962 || Bruins lead 2–0 || 
|- style="background:#fcf;"
| 3 || May 4 || Philadelphia || 1–5 || Boston || || Boucher || 17,565 || Bruins lead 3–0 || 
|- style="background:#fcf;"
| 4 || May 6 || Philadelphia || 1–5 || Boston || || Bobrovsky || 17,565  || Bruins win 4–0 || 
|-

|-
| Legend:

Player statistics

Scoring
 Position abbreviations: C = Center; D = Defense; G = Goaltender; LW = Left Wing; RW = Right Wing
  = Joined team via a transaction (e.g., trade, waivers, signing) during the season. Stats reflect time with the Flyers only.
  = Left team via a transaction (e.g., trade, waivers, release) during the season. Stats reflect time with the Flyers only.

Goaltending

Awards and records

Awards

Records

Among the team records set during the 2010–11 season was winning a franchise record 25 games on the road (subsequently tied in 2011–12) and tying the team record for fewest shutouts in a season (0).

Milestones

Transactions
The Flyers were involved in the following transactions from June 10, 2010, the day after the deciding game of the 2010 Stanley Cup Finals, through June 15, 2011, the day of the deciding game of the 2011 Stanley Cup Finals.

Trades

Players acquired

Players lost

Signings

Draft picks

Philadelphia's picks at the 2010 NHL Entry Draft, which was held at the Staples Center in Los Angeles on June 25–26, 2010. The Flyers traded their 2009 and 2010, 29th overall, first-round picks, Joffrey Lupul, Luca Sbisa and a conditional 2010 or 2011 third-round pick to the Anaheim Ducks for Ryan Dingle and Chris Pronger on June 26, 2009. They also traded their original second-round pick, 59th overall, and Denis Gauthier to the Los Angeles Kings for Patrik Hersley and Ned Lukacevic on July 1, 2008.

Farm teams
American Hockey League – Adirondack Phantoms (Standings)
 ECHL – Greenville Road Warriors

Notes

References
General
 
 
 
Specific

External links

 2010–11 Philadelphia Flyers season at ESPN
 Philadelphia Flyers Historical Salaries from CapGeek.com

2010-11
2010–11 NHL season by team
2010–11 in American ice hockey by team
Philadelphia
Philadelphia